Julian Chavez (born May 31, 2002) is an American professional soccer player who plays as a midfielder.

Club career
Born in Sacramento, California, Chavez began his career as part of the Sacramento Republic youth academy before signing a USL Academy contract with the club's first team on March 6, 2020. Chavez then made his professional debut on August 9 in a USL Championship match against Portland Timbers 2, coming on as an 83rd-minute substitute for Sam Werner in the 1–0 victory. On September 2, he scored his first professional goal in the 96th minute against the Portland Timbers 2. His goal was the game winner in a 2–1 victory.

In February 2022, Chavez signed with USL League One side Central Valley Fuego ahead of their inaugural season.

Career statistics

Club

References

External links
Profile at the Sacramento Republic website

2002 births
Living people
American soccer players
Association football midfielders
Sacramento Republic FC players
Central Valley Fuego FC players
USL Championship players
Soccer players from Sacramento, California